Stephen Thurston Adey (died 28 October 1801) was a British politician and the Member of Parliament for Higham Ferrers from 1798 to 1801.

See also
 List of MPs in the first United Kingdom Parliament

References

Year of birth missing
1801 deaths
British MPs 1796–1800
UK MPs 1801–1802
Members of the Parliament of Great Britain for English constituencies
Members of the Parliament of the United Kingdom for English constituencies